Haugland is a small village in Alver Municipality (formerly Radøy Municipality) in Vestland county, Norway. The village is located just east of the larger village of Bøvågen on the northern part of the island of Radøy.

References

Villages in Vestland
Alver (municipality)